In the Shadows or In the Shadow may refer to:

 In the Shadows (album), 1993 album by Mercyful Fate, and the title track
 "In the Shadows" (song), 2003 song by The Rasmus
 In the Shadows (2001 film), 2001 film starring Matthew Modine
 In the Shadows (2010 film), 2010 German film
 In the Shadow (2012 film), Czech film
 In the Shadows (2017 film), 2017 Hindi film
 In the Shadows (Torchwood), audiobook based on the TV series Torchwood
 In the Shadows (video game), 2017 video game
 "In the Shadows", a song by Children of Bodom from Something Wild
 "In the Shadows", a song by The Stranglers from Black and White